The 1984 Seattle Seahawks season was the team's ninth season with the National Football League (NFL). The season opener was moved from Sunday to Monday afternoon on Labor Day to avoid a conflict with a Seattle Mariners baseball game.

The 1984 Seahawks were a well-balanced team on offense and defense. They scored 418 points (26.1 per game), and gave up only 282 points (17.6 per game), both ranked 5th in the NFL. Their point differential of +136 points was third in the NFL; the Seahawks' giveaway/takeaway ratio was +24, best in the league. The team's 63 defensive takeaways is the most in NFL history for a 16-game schedule, and the most since the merger.

The team's offense boasted a 3,000-yard passer in quarterback Dave Krieg (3,671 yards), and a 1,000-yard wide receiver in Steve Largent (74 receptions for 1,164 yards). The passing attack more than made up for the loss of star running back Curt Warner, who suffered a season-ending knee injury in the opener.

The Seahawks's defensive line generated an outstanding pass rush, with defensive ends Jeff Bryant and Jacob Green registering 14.5 and 13 sacks, respectively. Safety Kenny Easley led the team and league with 10 interceptions. Easley, Green, and NT Joe Nash made the All-Pro team.

In a wild Week 10 game against the Kansas City Chiefs, the Seahawks intercepted Kansas City's quarterbacks six times, and returned four of them for touchdowns. All the touchdown returns were for over 50 yards. In the game, the Seahawks set NFL records for most yards returning interceptions (325), and most interceptions-for-touchdowns in a game (4).

Seattle would make the playoffs for the second straight season. They defeated the defending Super Bowl champion Los Angeles Raiders 13–7 in the wild card round avenging their 1983 loss. However, they were not able to advance past the Miami Dolphins, as they lost in Miami 31–10 to a powerful Dolphins squad led by record setting second year quarterback Dan Marino, who they had defeated in the playoffs the previous season. After this season, the Seahawks wouldn't win another playoff game until their Super Bowl-appearing 2005 season.

1984 NFL Draft

Personnel

Staff

Final roster

     Starters in bold.
 (*) Denotes players that were selected for the 1985 Pro Bowl.

Schedule

Preseason

Source: Seahawks Media Guides

Regular season
Divisional matchups have the AFC West playing the NFC Central.

Bold indicates division opponents.
Source: 1984 NFL season results

Postseason

Standings

Game Summaries

Preseason

Week P1: at Tampa Bay Buccaneers

Week P2: vs. Buffalo Bills

Week P3: at Detroit Lions

Week P4: vs. St. Louis Cardinals

Week P5: at San Francisco 49ers

Regular season

Week 1: vs. Cleveland Browns

Week 2: vs. San Diego Chargers

Week 3: at New England Patriots

The Seahawks saw the Patriots erase a 23–0 deficit with 38 unanswered points led by new quarterback Tony Eason, who took over halfway through the game for Steve Grogan.

Week 4: vs. Chicago Bears

Week 5: at Minnesota Vikings

Week 6: at Los Angeles Raiders

Week 7: vs. Buffalo Bills

Week 8: at Green Bay Packers

Week 9: at San Diego Chargers

Week 10: vs. Kansas City Chiefs

Week 11: vs. Los Angeles Raiders

Week 12: at Cincinnati Bengals

Week 13: at Denver Broncos

Week 14: vs. Detroit Lions

Week 15: at Kansas City Chiefs

Week 16: vs. Denver Broncos

Postseason

Seattle entered the postseason as the #4 seed in the AFC.

AFC Wild Card Playoff: vs #5 Los Angeles Raiders

AFC Divisional Playoff: at #1 Miami Dolphins

References

External links
 Seahawks draft history at NFL.com
 1984 NFL season results at NFL.com

Seattle
Seattle Seahawks seasons